Revizto  (revisto - Latin for "visual check") - a cloud-based visual collaboration software for architects, engineers and contractors to communicate their design within the project team in a navigable 3D environment.

Overview
Using gaming technology and cloud solutions, Revizto brings together various BIM and CAD data to track all project issues in one centralized 3D environment. The Revizto platform is intuitive, easy-to-learn and adaptable to BIM workflows. With Revizto, BIM implementation is streamlined, allowing  AEC teams to speak a common language and share a single window into all project information.
Revizto converts Autodesk Revit BIMs and Trimble SketchUp models into interactive 3D environments with tools for collaboration and issue tracking platform.

Revizto is a cross-platform software that runs on 64-bit Windows, macOS, iOS and Android platforms and in most modern web browsers using Unity plugin.

Revizto has been reviewed by Ralph Grabowski in "CAD Digest", by Michael Anonuevo in "Club Revit" and featured in article "Seven Digital Tools to Up Your Game" in "Architect magazine".

References 

Software add-ons
CAD file formats